Ernst Pöhner (11 January 1870, Hof, Bavaria – 11 April 1925) was Munich's Chief of Police ('Green' Police President) from 1919 to 1922.  He was a vigorous anti-communist and anti-Semite who was in office when Bavarian Minister President Gustav Ritter von Kahr had , or "Eastern Jews", expelled from Bavaria. Pöhner was also instrumental in mounting terror and in supporting Organisation Consul death squads. Confronted with the charge that entire groups of right-wing political assassins were at large and working in and around Munich, he is reported to have said: "Yes ... but too few of them."

He was closely linked to Gustav von Kahr, who had his own plans for overthrowing the government of the Weimar Republic but who opposed the 1923 Hitler Beer Hall Putsch. Pöhner was a central figure in the putsch and was to be named Bavaria's minister president if the coup succeeded. He was subsequently convicted with Hitler in 1924 of high treason and sentenced to five years in prison. He was released three months later and died under mysterious circumstances in a car accident in 1925. He is mentioned in Hitler's Mein Kampf.

Further reading
John Dornberg, The Putsch That Failed, Hitler's Rehearsal for Power, Weidenfeld & Nicolson, 1982.
Harold J Gordon Jr, Hitler and the Beer Hall Putsch, Princeton University Press, 1972.
Die Chronik der Stadt Hof, Band VIII, Ausgabe 1936. (German)

References

1870 births
1925 deaths
People from Hof, Bavaria
People from the Kingdom of Bavaria
German National People's Party politicians
Nazi Party politicians
Alldeutscher Verband members
Collaborators who participated in the Beer Hall Putsch
German police chiefs
German police officers convicted of crimes
Military personnel of Bavaria
Thule Society members